Andrew George Lindsay Nicol (born 9 May 1951) is a retired judge of the High Court of England and Wales.

He was educated at City of London Freemen's School, Selwyn College, Cambridge, and Harvard Law School (LLM). He was called to the bar at Middle Temple in 1978 and became a bencher there in 2004. He was made a QC in 1995, deputy judge of the High Court from 2003 to 2009, and judge of the High Court of Justice (Queen's Bench Division) since 2009. He co-wrote Media Law with Geoffrey Robertson. Nicol was quoted as saying: "Trials derive their legitimacy from being conducted in public; the judge presides as a surrogate for the people, who are entitled to see and approve the power exercised on their behalf. Those who assist the prosecution can and should be protected by other means. No matter how fair, justice must still be seen before it can be said to be done".

Controversial cases

David Sellu
Nicol was the judge in the trial of consultant surgeon David Sellu in November 2013. Sellu was found guilty of gross negligence manslaughter following the death of a patient under his care. He served 15 months imprisonment of a 30-month sentence. After release, Sellu's appeal against the conviction was successful in 2016. The successful ground for the appeal was that Nicol had failed to instruct the jury properly regarding the grossness element of the offence.

Johnny Depp/The Sun
Nicol presided over the 2020 libel suit Depp v News Group Newspapers Ltd, in which Johnny Depp sued British tabloid newspaper The Sun, which had claimed in an article that Depp was a "wife beater". Nicol ruled against Depp, accepting that 12 of 14 alleged accounts of violence committed by Depp against Amber Heard were true. Depp was denied permission to appeal by two judges of the Court of Appeal, who stated that they did not believe there was a real prospect of overturning the findings, and that the hearings had been fair.

In 2022 Depp sued Heard in a separate defamation case in the United States. This case had a different outcome, with the jury finding that Heard had defamed Depp.

Personal life
Nicol is married to Camilla Palmer; they have two sons.

See also
 Ferdinand v MGN Ltd
 R v Incedal
 Depp v News Group Newspapers Ltd
 Death of Keith Blakelock
 Murder of Tia Sharp

References

1951 births
Living people
People educated at City of London Freemen's School
Alumni of Selwyn College, Cambridge
Harvard Law School alumni
Members of the Middle Temple
Queen's Bench Division judges
English King's Counsel
Knights Bachelor